Grant Drumheller is an American figurative painter.

Biography 

Drumheller earned his BFA (1976) and Master of Fine Arts (1978) degrees cum laude from Boston University. He also studied with Philip Guston, James Weeks and Reed Kay. Drumheller has taught at Boston University, the Art Institute of Boston and is currently Professor of Art at the University of New Hampshire. Originally he painted large works alluding to myth and allegory, but now works on smaller pieces.

Awards and honors
2008
Visiting Artist, American Academy in Rome

2004
Finalist, Artist Advancement Award, Greater Piscataqua Charitable Foundation

2002
Hatch Fund Award, College of Liberal Arts, Dept of Art and art History. In support of the catalog to accompany the Boston
University Show,“A Private View: Paintings by Grant Drumheller”.

1996 New England Foundation for the Arts- NEA Regional
Fellowship in Painting

1993
Discretionary Fund Award, UNH.

2001, '98, '95, '93, '91
Liberal Arts Faculty Research Grant, UNH

1992, '89
UNH Faculty Fellowship, summer

1986
Pollock-Krasner Foundation Grant

1983
National Endowment for the Arts, Artists Fellowship
Alternate, Prix de Rome in Painting

1982
The MacDowell Foundation, Jean and Louis Dreyfus Fellow
Yaddo Art Colony, Invitation

1981
Blanche Colman Award

1978-79 
Fulbright-Hays Grant, Painting in Italy

1976-78 
Graduate Teaching Fellowship, Boston University

1976
Harold C Case Scholarship.

References

External links
Personal Website

20th-century American painters
American male painters
21st-century American painters
21st-century American male artists
Living people
Boston University College of Fine Arts alumni
University of New Hampshire faculty
Boston University faculty
Year of birth missing (living people)
20th-century American male artists